The Electric Cinema was the first purpose-built cinema in the city of York, in England. It is a Grade II listed building.

Early films were screened in various temporary locations in York, and in 1908, the New Street Wesleyan Chapel was converted into the Hippodrome Cinema.  In 1911, National Electric Theatres constructed the Electric Cinema as the first purpose-built cinema in the city, lying on Fossgate, in the city centre.  In 1951, the cinema was renamed the Scala, but it closed in 1957.

The empty cinema was purchased by Macdonalds furniture shop, which already occupied the building next door.  The shop closed in 2016, and the following year, it reopened as the Cosy Club restaurant and bar.

The oldest part of the building is the boundary wall at the rear, the base of which is mediaeval, with later additions, and was originally part of the wall of the York Carmelite Friary.  In front of it is a late-19th-century building, which has been fully incorporated into the main, front, part of the building, which dates from 1911.  The front to Fossgate is covered in glazed tiles and faience, and takes the form of a large arch, supported on columns.  Inside, various plaster mouldings from the cinema survive, as does the decorated panelled ceiling.

References

Buildings and structures completed in 1911
Cinemas in Yorkshire
Fossgate
Grade II listed buildings in York
Grade II listed cinemas